Andreas Rudolf von Planta (24 April 1819, in Samedan – 19 April 1889) was a Swiss politician and President of the Swiss National Council (1865/1866).

External links 
 
 

1819 births
1889 deaths
People from Maloja District
Swiss nobility
Swiss Calvinist and Reformed Christians
Liberal Party of Switzerland politicians
Members of the National Council (Switzerland)
Presidents of the National Council (Switzerland)
Andreas